George Schlack House is a historic home located near Ridgeway, Berkeley County, West Virginia. It was built in 1913 and is a -story rectangular Colonial Revival style dwelling built of concrete block and finished in rock-faced concrete block. It is five bays in width and four bays deep with a truncated hipped roof and denticulated trim.

It was listed on the National Register of Historic Places in 2008.

References

Houses on the National Register of Historic Places in West Virginia
Colonial Revival architecture in West Virginia
Houses completed in 1913
Houses in Berkeley County, West Virginia
National Register of Historic Places in Berkeley County, West Virginia
1913 establishments in West Virginia